The Soowahlie First Nation, or Soowahlie Band, is a band government of the Sto:lo people located in the Upper Fraser Valley region at Cultus Lake, British Columbia, Canada.  They are a member government of the Stó:lō Tribal Council. The Reserve land area currently comprises 533.4 hectares and has a population of 373.

Indian Reserves
Indian Reserves under the administration of the Soowahlie Band are:
Grass Indian Reserve No. 15, 1/2 mile southeast of Chilliwack, 64.80 ha (shared with eight other bands
Pekw'Xe:yles (Peckquaylis) - 10.30 ha. (shared with 20 other bands)
Soowahlie Indian Reserve No. 14, on the left bank of the Chilliwack River, one mile south of Vedder Crossing, 458.30 ha.

References

External links
Official Site

Sto:lo governments
First Nations governments in the Lower Mainland
Politics of Chilliwack